Ann Maria may refer to:

Media
"Ann-Maria" (song), a single by Dutch girl group Luv' in 1980
Ann Maria Kalippilaanu (English: "Ann Maria is in Fury"), a 2016 Indian Malayalam children's film

People
AnnMaria De Mars (1958), an American technology executive, author and judoka
Ann Maria Bradshaw (1801–1862) English actress and vocalist
Ann Maria Thorne (1813–1881), American concert singer and actress